Juan Miguel Rodriguez (born May 26, 1967) is a Cuban sport shooter and Olympic medallist, born in Havana. He received a bronze medal in skeet shooting at the 2004 Summer Olympics in Athens.

References

External links

1967 births
Living people
Cuban male sport shooters
Skeet shooters
Shooters at the 1996 Summer Olympics
Shooters at the 2000 Summer Olympics
Shooters at the 2004 Summer Olympics
Shooters at the 2016 Summer Olympics
Olympic bronze medalists for Cuba
Olympic shooters of Cuba
Olympic medalists in shooting
Medalists at the 2004 Summer Olympics
Pan American Games gold medalists for Cuba
Pan American Games bronze medalists for Cuba
Shooters at the 1999 Pan American Games
Shooters at the 2015 Pan American Games
Pan American Games medalists in shooting
Medalists at the 1999 Pan American Games
Medalists at the 2015 Pan American Games
Medalists at the 2011 Pan American Games
20th-century Cuban people
21st-century Cuban people